Quadrastate is a mini-album by English electronic music group 808 State. It was released in July 1989 through Creed Records. It contains the original version of "Pacific State", one of the most popular tracks by 808 State, which later made the band famous after extended airplay on BBC Radio 1 led to the band being signed to major label ZTT Records.

The record entered the Top Dance Albums chart at tenth place on 9 September 1989. It reached number one on the same chart on 4 November.

On 19 May 2008, the British Rephlex Records label re-released the record in double vinyl and CD format.

The re-issued version featured seven additional bonus tracks not included in the original. In addition, there were some alterations to the originally released version, including editing to the track "106".

Track listing

Original 12" mini-album release (1989):

Side A
"Pacific State" – 6:16
"106" – 0:48
"State Ritual" – 5:53

Side B
"Disco State" – 5:01
"Fire Cracker" – 4:41
"State to State" – 5:52

CD Track Listing

"Pacific State"
"106"
"State Ritual"
"Disco State"
"Fire Cracker"
"State to State"

Additional tracks on re-release
"Let Yourself Go (303 Mix)" – Originally released on 12" as a single in 1989.
"Deepville"
"Got it Huh" – (808 State vs. Zenarchy, 89).
"Techclock"
"In Yolk" – Early version of "God C.P.U." Hypnotone
"State Ritual Scam"
"Let Yourself Go (D50 Mix)"

Personnel
Graham Massey
Martin Price
Andy Barker
Darren Partington
Gerald Simpson
Adam Clark

References

1989 debut albums
808 State albums